Seymour Harris Partnership is an architectural partnership based in Birmingham, England. Buildings designed by the practice include Colmore Gate in Birmingham, Queensgate Market in Huddersfield and St David's Hall in Cardiff.

Architecture firms based in Birmingham, West Midlands